Lorugumu is a settlement in Turkana, located in Kenya's Rift Valley Province. This area has the Medical Missionaries of Mary medical dispensary, small hospital and school.

References 

Populated places in Turkana County